Detroit Detention Center (DDC) is a detention center located in eastern Detroit, Michigan. The facility, which operates as a central lockup for Detroit, is staffed by personnel from the Detroit Police Department and the Michigan Department of Corrections.

General
The facility, which operates as a central lockup for Detroit and can hold up to 200 detainees. It is adjacent to the Detroit Reentry Center.

History
The facility previously housed Mound Correctional Facility, which was closed on January 8, 2012. It was reopened as part of an inter-agency collaboration between the State of Michigan and City of Detroit in August 2013 as the Detroit Detention Center.

Staffing
It was reopened as part of an inter-agency collaboration between the State of Michigan and City of Detroit in an effort to reduce the number of Detroit police officers required to staff the facility. The Michigan Department of Corrections provides the center with 51 staff.

See also

 List of Michigan state prisons

References

Prisons in Michigan
Buildings and structures in Detroit
2013 establishments in Michigan
Detention centers